The 2020 Spanish motorcycle Grand Prix was the second round of the 2020 Grand Prix motorcycle racing season and the first round of the 2020 MotoGP World Championship. It was held at the Circuito de Jerez-Ángel Nieto in Jerez de la Frontera on 19 July 2020. It was initially scheduled to be held on 3 May but was moved due to the COVID-19 pandemic.

Fabio Quartararo took his first victory in the premier class, the first for a French rider since Regis Laconi at the 1999 Valencian Grand Prix, the first for a Yamaha satellite team, as well as the first non-Honda satellite rider to win a Grand Prix.

Background

Impact of the COVID-19 pandemic 
The originally scheduled calendar for the 2020 championship was heavily affected by the COVID-19 pandemic. Several Grands Prix were cancelled or postponed after the aborted opening round in Qatar, prompting the Fédération Internationale de Motocyclisme to draft a new calendar. The start of the championship was delayed until 19 July, with the Circuito de Jerez-Ángel Nieto  hosting the Spanish Grand Prix as the opening round of the championship. Organisers of the race signed a contract with Dorna Sports, the sport's commercial rights holder, to host a second round at the circuit on 26 July (a week after the first race) to be known as the Andalusian Grand Prix. The back-to-back Spanish races would mark the first time that a country hosts back-to-back races in the same season. This would also mark the first time in the sport's history that the same venue and circuit layout would have hosted back-to-back World Championship races and the first time that a MotoGP race weekend was held behind closed doors.

Entrants 
Twenty two riders representing eleven teams entered the race. Álex Márquez and Brad Binder made their competitive debuts with Repsol Honda and Red Bull KTM Factory Racing respectively, and Iker Lecuona started his first full season with Red Bull KTM Tech3 having previously raced for them at the 2019 Valencian Grand Prix.

Race

MotoGP

 Cal Crutchlow suffered a back injury in a crash during warm-up and was declared unfit to start the race.
 Álex Rins suffered a shoulder injury in a crash during qualifying and was declared unfit to start the race.

Moto2

Moto3

MotoE

All bikes manufactured by Energica.

Championship standings after the race
Below are the standings for the top five riders, constructors, and teams after the round.

MotoGP

Riders' Championship standings

Constructors' Championship standings

Teams' Championship standings

Moto2

Riders' Championship standings

Constructors' Championship standings

Teams' Championship standings

Moto3

Riders' Championship standings

Constructors' Championship standings

Teams' Championship standings

MotoE

Notes

References

External links

Spain
Motorcycle Grand Prix
Spanish motorcycle Grand Prix
Spanish motorcycle Grand Prix
Spanish motorcycle Grand Prix